AMAP-ADS (active defence system) is a hard-kill active protection system (APS), developed by the German company ADS Gesellschaft für aktive Schutzsysteme, a subsidiary of Rheinmetall and IBD Deisenroth Engineering, as part of their Advanced Modular Armor Protection concept. The system is also known under the name AAC in Sweden and as Shark in France. Due to its modular design it can be adapted to a broad range of vehicles. In particular, it is capable of protecting light vehicles against large caliber weapons which the vehicles' light armor wouldn't stop.

Design

The system has a modular design that can be adapted to almost every vehicle; it weighs 140 kg for light vehicles and up to 500 kg for heavy vehicles. The main elements are the sensor-countermeasure modules arranged all around the vehicle. A processor determines the type and the trajectory of the approaching target. Subsequently, a countermeasure module close to the calculated impact point is activated. This countermeasure destroys or disrupts the approaching threat so that it cannot penetrate the vehicle.

The arrangement of sensors and countermeasures provides a hemispherical protection. The overlapping sectors of the sensor-countermeasure modules enable the system to defeat multi-attacks. Due to the short reaction time of approximately 560 microseconds, threats can be eliminated at ranges of approximately 10 m, not depending on the speed of the threat. AMAP-ADS is one of the fastest active protection systems, faster than Quick Kill, Iron Fist or Trophy. Since the countermeasures create a non-fragmenting stream of material, collateral damage to nearby troops or civilians is minimized. These are important aspects in urban environments. In comparison to other hard-kill systems, there are no moving parts. This makes ADS light and reduces power requirements. Therefore, it can be installed on lightweight vehicles.

The system is not intended to completely substitute for passive base armor. Larger caliber projectiles will only be fragmented and not entirely deflected. Therefore, a minimum of passive armor is still required to absorb the residual energy of the fragments.

Applications
Prototypes have already been tested on several vehicles including Marder, SEP, Combat Vehicle 90 and Patria AMV LMV.

Singapore has decided to use AMAP-ADS as active protection system on their vehicles, while a number of European armies are considering buying it.

Successful demonstrations
AMAP-ADS has been tested on several platforms. As part of the AAC (Active Armor Concept) it was installed on the SEP designed by BAE Systems Hägglunds.
On 17 April 2008 it was tested in Sweden under urban combat conditions. Threat rejection and multi-hit capability were proven, when 7.62 mm rounds and RPG-7s were fired from a short distance of some 50 m, a range typical for urban missions. In that test the RPG-7 projectiles were destroyed. The system also detected a 7.62 mm round but rejected it as a threat.

US testings
A Textron ASV vehicle has been modified and equipped with the AMAP-ADS hardkill-system. Then it was tested 6 weeks extensively at Redstone Arsenal in Huntsville, Alabama. These tests were overseen by the Office of the Secretary of Defense. Different types of RPGs and ATGMs were launched at various spots like the sides or the roof from close range (including multi-hit attacks, in which multiple threats were used in a short period of time. AMAP-ADS met or even exceeded all US requirements during the tests.
The operationability in hot climates was also proven.

References
Strategie & Technik International Edition II/2007, Active Stand-Off Protection Systems, p.35-43

External links
 Manufacturer links (Authorization Required)
Webpage of Manufacturer
AMAP-ADS Simulation (Video)
Video of a live demonstration of AMAP-ADS on the Eurosatory 2010.
SEP DEMO
Active Defense System (ADS)
Active Protection Systems Are Maturing
ADS Gmbh website

Vehicle armour
Armoured fighting vehicle equipment
Land active protection systems
Weapons countermeasures